Lydia Augusta Arsens (March 18, 1906 – February 25, 1983) was a Canadian politician. She served as MLA for the Victoria City riding in the Legislative Assembly of British Columbia from 1953 to 1956, as a member of the British Columbia Social Credit Party.

References

1906 births
1983 deaths
British Columbia Social Credit Party MLAs
Women MLAs in British Columbia
People from Didsbury, Alberta
Politicians from Victoria, British Columbia
20th-century Canadian women politicians